Phi Velorum (φ Vel, φ Velorum) is a star in the constellation Vela. It is a blue-white B-type supergiant with an apparent magnitude of +3.53. It is approximately 1,590 light years from Earth.

Nomenclature
φ Velorum (Latinised to Phi Velorum, abbreviated to φ Vel) is the Bayer designation for this star. It is also listed as HR 3940 in the Bright Star Catalogue and HD 86440 in the Henry Draper Catalogue. It has the traditional name Tseen Ke, from Chinese 天紀 (Mandarin tiānjì) "star chart".  (lit. "Record of Heaven").

Properties
It has exhausted its core hydrogen and left the main sequence to become a supergiant.

Companion
φ Velorum has an optical companion 39" away. It is a 12th magnitude K0 giant star.

References

Velorum, Phi
Vela (constellation)
B-type supergiants
Tseen Ke
048774
3940
086440
Durchmusterung objects